Reboot is the second studio album from the British punk rock band London.   It was released as a CD in February 2012 and is their first studio album since the release of Animal Games on MCA Records in 1978. It was recorded at Eagle Studios, Hampshire, and DGM Soundworld. An LP version on 180 gram heavyweight vinyl was released in March 2018.

Personnel
 Riff Regan (vocals)
 Steve Voice (bass, guitars, vocals)
 Hugh O’Donnell (guitar, mellotron)
 Colin Watterston (drums)

Track listing/composer
 When The Night Falls (Terry Nolder)
 Pop (Steve Voice)
 Minute Man (Steve Voice)
 Every Dog (Riff Regan, Steve Voice)
 Rebecca (Riff Regan, Steve Voice)
 Animal Attraction (Riff Regan)
 Like It Never Happened (Steve Voice)
 Celebrity Crash (Riff Regan, Steve Voice)
 Standing Alone (Riff Regan, Steve Voice, Hugh O’Donnell)
 Get Out Of London (Riff Regan, Steve Voice)
 77 Dreams (Riff Regan, Steve Voice)

External links
The official London website

2012 albums
London (punk band) albums